The Corey House/Hotel, on N. Main at 2nd St. in Grove, Oklahoma, was built in 1899–1909. It was listed on the National Register of Historic Places in 1982.

A gingerbreaded porch runs across the front and joins the two buildings.

References

Hotels in Oklahoma
National Register of Historic Places in Delaware County, Oklahoma
Buildings and structures completed in 1899